Mark W. Roberson (born 13 March 1967) is a retired English javelin thrower. He represented England at four successive Commonwealth Games between 1990 and 2002.

Athletics career
He won the silver medal at the 1986 World Junior Championships, finished sixth at the 1990 Commonwealth Games, seventh at the 1994 Commonwealth Games, sixth at the 1998 European Championships, fourth at the 1998 Commonwealth Games and sixth at the 2002 Commonwealth Games.

Roberson was twice national champion after winning the 1997 AAA Championships and the 2001 United Kingdom Championships in Athletics.

His personal best throw was 85.67 metres, achieved in July 1998 in Gateshead.

References

1967 births
Living people
English male javelin throwers
Athletes (track and field) at the 1990 Commonwealth Games
Athletes (track and field) at the 1994 Commonwealth Games
Athletes (track and field) at the 1998 Commonwealth Games
Athletes (track and field) at the 2002 Commonwealth Games
Commonwealth Games competitors for England